Erich Fuchs (9 April 1902 – 25 July 1980) was an SS functionary who worked for the Action T4 mass-murder program, and for the Operation Reinhard phase of the Holocaust.

Fuchs was charged with war crimes at the Bełżec Trial in 1963–64, for which he was acquitted. As more evidence came to light, Fuchs was rearrested and tried at the Sobibor Trial in Hagen. He was charged with participation in the Holocaust and on 20 December 1966, found guilty of being an accessory to the mass murder of at least 79,000 Jews. Fuchs was sentenced to four years imprisonment.

Life
Fuchs was born Erich Fritz Erhard Fuchs in Berlin. He began his career as a motor mechanic.  He joined the Nazi Party and the SA in May 1933. Following the outbreak of World War II, in 1940 Fuchs was assigned to the clandestine Action T4 euthanasia program. He served as Dr. Irmfried Eberl's driver while Eberl was Medical Director of the T-4 killing centers at Brandenburg and Bernburg. Fuchs was present at many of the gassings of the disabled people. When the Final Solution was set in place at Wannsee, Fuchs was transferred to the newly built Bełżec extermination camp in German-occupied Poland for six weeks to install the killing apparatus there. He later testified:

After the successful installation of the gassing motor at Belzec, in April 1942 Fuchs was moved to the next secret construction site at the Sobibor extermination camp. The gas-fueled, two-hundred-horse-power engine was allocated for him already in nearby Lvov by the SS men of Operation Reinhard. He remained at Sobibór for at least four weeks. In Fuchs's own words:

While at Sobibor, Fuchs also operated this engine as it fed the gas chambers.  Now an SS-Scharführer (Sergeant), Fuchs went to Treblinka extermination camp, under the command of his old boss Eberl. He would later testify:

Near the end of 1942, Fuchs returned briefly to Bernburg Euthanasia Centre. Then, from December to February 1943 he was stationed at Wiesloch psychiatric institution, where he was involved in "euthanasia research" and again, present during the gassing operations. In March 1943 Fuchs was removed from Action T4, and his work in mass murder and genocide was done.

After the war he worked as a lorry driver, motor mechanic and car salesman. Fuchs was put on trial at the Bełżec Trial in Munich 1963–64, for which he was acquitted. Fuchs was rearrested and tried at the Sobibor Trial in Hagen.  He was charged with participation in the mass murder of approximately 3,600 Jews. On 20 December 1966, Fuchs was found guilty of being an accessory to the mass murder of at least 79,000 Jews and sentenced to four years imprisonment. Fuchs was married for the sixth time during the trial.  Fuchs died on 25 July 1980 at the age of 78.

References

1902 births
1980 deaths
People from Berlin
Aktion T4 personnel
Belzec extermination camp personnel
People convicted in the Sobibor trial
Sobibor extermination camp personnel
SS non-commissioned officers
Treblinka extermination camp personnel
Truck drivers
Holocaust perpetrators in Poland
Automobile salespeople